Halina Molka (born 4 April 1953 in Kalinki) is a Polish politician. She was elected to the Sejm on 25 September 2005, getting 3706 votes in 10 Piotrków Trybunalski district as a candidate from the Samoobrona Rzeczpospolitej Polskiej list.

See also
Members of Polish Sejm 2005-2007

External links
Halina Molka - parliamentary page - includes declarations of interest, voting record, and transcripts of speeches.

1953 births
Living people
People from Radomsko County
Members of the Polish Sejm 2005–2007
Women members of the Sejm of the Republic of Poland
Self-Defence of the Republic of Poland politicians
Polish United Workers' Party members
21st-century Polish women politicians
20th-century Polish women